Miss Saint Martin may refer to two separate beauty pageants:
Miss Saint Martin and Saint Barthélemy, a beauty pageant in the French overseas collectivity of Saint Martin
Miss Sint Maarten, a beauty pageant in the Dutch constituent country of Sint Maarten